The Red River Delta or Hong River Delta is the flat low-lying plain formed by the Red River and its distributaries merging with the Thái Bình River in northern Vietnam. Hồng (紅) is a Sino-Vietnamese word for "red" or "crimson." The delta has the smallest area but highest population and population density of all regions. It is an agriculturally rich and densely populated area. Most of the land is devoted to rice cultivation.

Eight provinces together with two municipalities, the capital Hanoi, and the port Haiphong form the delta. It has a population of almost 23 million in 2019.

In 2021, Paul Sidwell proposed that the locus of Proto-Austroasiatic languages was in this area about 4,000–4,500 years before present. The Hong River Delta is the cradle of the Vietnamese nation. Water puppetry originated in the rice paddies here. The region was bombed by United States warplanes during the Vietnam War. The region was designated as the Red River Delta Biosphere Reserve as part of UNESCO's Man and the Biosphere Programme in 2004.

Provinces 

 Quảng Ninh Province is sometimes included as a province of the Red River Delta. Alternatively, it is seen as part of the Northeast region.
 Hà Tây Province was merged into Hanoi in 2008.

Geography
Spanning some 150 km in width, the Red River Delta is located in the western coastal zone of the Gulf of Tonkin. The Red River is the second largest river in Vietnam and one of the five largest rivers on the East Asia coast. Its catchment covers parts of China and Vietnam and its water and sediment discharges greatly influence the hydrology in the Gulf of Tonkin.

Delta economy

In 2003, of the 78 million people in Vietnam, almost a third (24 million) live in the Red River basin, including over 17 million people in the delta itself. There are many large industrial zones in the Red River delta clustering in Viet Tri, Hanoi, Haiphong and Nam Dinh. Most of the population works in rice cultivation but the delta region hosts other important economic activities such as fisheries, aquaculture, land reclamation for agriculture, harbor construction, mangrove forestry, etc. The socio-economic development in the delta is also affected by seasonal storms, flooding, coastal erosion, silting, salt water intrusion, etc.

Though the Red River Delta makes up only 5% of Vietnam's land, 30% of the country's population live there, making it the most densely populated part of the country. 80% of the population are employed in agriculture, but the agricultural lands of the delta amount to only about .3-.5 hectares per household, making the limited supply of arable lands a significant constraint to improving living standards.

Agriculturally the Red River Delta is the second most important rice-producing area in Vietnam, accounting for 20% of the national crop. Production of rice is close to optimal with very little yield gap to exploit and employing double cropping techniques to achieve close to maximum yields. However the rich soil of the delta does present a possibility of crop diversification and there is potential for further development of aquaculture. With these developmental pressures the estuarine environment and ecosystem face degradation due to threats of pollution, over-fishing and aquaculture destroying natural habitats..

See also
Red River Delta coalfield

Notes and references

http://www.academia.edu/7225727/Towards_an_environmental_history_of_the_eastern_Red_River_Delta_Vietnam_c.900-1400

 
.
Gulf of Tonkin
Regions of Vietnam
Biosphere reserves of Vietnam
Landforms of Vietnam
River deltas of Asia
Landforms of Bắc Ninh province
Landforms of Hà Nam province
Landforms of Hải Dương province
Landforms of Hưng Yên province
Landforms of Nam Định province
Landforms of Ninh Bình province
Landforms of Thái Bình province
Landforms of Vĩnh Phúc province
Landforms of Hanoi
Landforms of Haiphong